"Valley of Dreams" is a science fiction short story by the American writer Stanley G. Weinbaum, originally published in the November 1934 issue of Wonder Stories.  It was Weinbaum's second published story and is a sequel to his first story, "A Martian Odyssey".

Plot summary

Two weeks before the Ares is scheduled to leave Mars, Captain Harrison sends the American chemist Dick Jarvis and the French biologist "Frenchy" Leroy to retrieve the film that Jarvis took before his auxiliary rocket crashed into the Thyle highlands the week before. Along the way, the Earthmen stop at the city of the cart creatures and the site of the pyramid building creature for Leroy to take some samples. After picking up the film canisters from the crashed rocket at Thyle II, the two men fly east to Thyle I to look for signs of the birdlike Martian, Tweel.

Near a canal, the men find a strange, deserted city thousands of years old. The buildings are inhabited by birdlike Martians of Tweel's species, including Tweel himself, and Jarvis and the Martian enjoy a happy reunion. Jarvis persuades Tweel to guide them through the city.

In one building, they come across a ratlike being hunched over a Martian book (this species recurs in The Mad Moon). Tweel angrily chases the rat-thing away and replaces the book on a shelf, though the Earthmen are not sure whether the rat-thing was reading the book or eating it. Elsewhere in the building, which seems to be a library, Tweel shows the Earthmen a huge mural of a human kneeling before a seated Martian. When Leroy remarks that the Martian in the mural looks like the Ancient Egyptian god Thoth, Tweel excitedly repeats the name, pointing to itself and all around them at the city. The Earthmen realize that Tweel's people, the Thoth, had visited ancient Egypt and had been an inspiration for the Ibis-headed god. (This is actually anachronistic, since Thoth was the classical Greek version of the god's name.)
 
Over the next three days, Tweel shows the Earthmen around the city, including a solar-powered pumping station designed to move water down the canal. Finally, a mile south of the ancient Martian city, the Earthmen find a valley filled with dream-beasts. As the dream-beasts mesmerize them, the two Earthmen see everything they have ever desired spread out before them, and rush forward helplessly. Tweel attacks one of the dream-beasts, momentarily freeing Jarvis. The Earthman kills the dream-beast with a pistol shot, then kills another that is attacking Leroy, and the three of them flee from the valley. Jarvis and Leroy return to their rocket to recover from their encounter with the dream-beasts.

Before returning to the Ares, as a parting gift, the Earthmen take Tweel to the wreck of the other rocket, and give it the rocket's atomic power plant. In time, the Thoth will be able to master atomic power, and will no longer be dependent on solar power to run their civilization.

Collections
"Valley of Dreams" appears in the following Stanley G. Weinbaum collections:

 A Martian Odyssey and Others (1949)
 A Martian Odyssey and Other Science Fiction Tales (1974)
 The Best of Stanley G. Weinbaum (1974)
 Interplanetary Odysseys (2006)

External links
 
  (Transcribed from "A Martian Odyssey and Others" published in 1949.)

Short stories by Stanley G. Weinbaum
1934 short stories
Short stories set on Mars
Works originally published in Wonder Stories
Ancient astronauts in fiction